Ystad (older )  is a town and the seat of Ystad Municipality, in Scania County, Sweden. Ystad had 18,350 inhabitants in 2010. The settlement dates from the 11th century and has become a busy ferryport, local administrative centre, and tourist attraction. The detective series Wallander, created by Henning Mankell, is set primarily in Ystad.

In 1285, the town's name was written Ystath. Its original meaning is not fully understood, but the y probably is related to an old word for the yew tree, while stad means town or place.

History 

After the time of Absalon, Bishop of Roskilde and Archbishop of Lund, peace was brought to the area in the 11th century, fishing families settled at the mouth of the river Vassa as herring fishing became the main source of trade. Ystad was not mentioned in documents until 1244, in a record of King Eric's visit to the town with his brother, Abel. A Franciscan monastery, Gråbrödraklostret, was founded in 1267, and Ystad joined the Hanseatic League in the 14th century.

The charter of 1599 gave the town the right to export oxen. Ystad, together with all of Scania, was transferred from Denmark to Sweden following the Treaty of Roskilde in 1658.

By 1866 Ystad had a railway connection and it was established as a garrison town in the 1890s. After World War II, ferry services to Poland and to the Danish island of Bornholm were opened.

Demographics
In 1658, Ystad's population was about 1,600 and, by 1850 it had reached 5,000. The increased importance brought by the railway and the garrison in the 1890s drove the population above 10,000.

In culture
In his novel Inferno (1897), August Strindberg describes Ystad like so:

The little town to which I now betook myself lies in the extreme south of Sweden, on the seacoast. It is an old pirates' and smugglers' haunt, in which exotic traces of all parts of the world have been left by various voyagers.

Ystad is the setting of the Swedish crime drama Wallander.

Infrastructure

Economy
Some of the main industries of the town are trade, handicraft and tourism, derived from being one of the best-preserved medieval towns in the Scania province and its association with the Wallander detective novels.

Transport

The ferry port has services to the Danish island of Bornholm, to Sassnitz in Germany, and to Świnoujście in Poland, the latter forming part of the E65 road route south from Malmö.

Ystad connects the Ystad Line and Österlen Line railways. Passenger traffic runs between Malmö and Simrishamn (operated by Skåne Commuter Rail). Until December 2017, a direct train service linked Ystad to Copenhagen via the Øresund Bridge (operated by Danish State Railways).

Sports
The most popular sport in Ystad is handball, with two big clubs. Ystads IF is in Elitserien (the highest Swedish men's national league) whilst IFK Ystad is situated in Division 1 (the second highest league). Several famous handball players have played for these clubs, including Per Carlén.

Media
The only newspaper published at present in Ystad is the Ystads Allehanda, which also covers the neighbouring municipalities of Skurup, Tomelilla, Simrishamn and Sjöbo. The newspaper was founded in 1873.

Places of interest

One of Sweden's best preserved medieval monasteries, the Greyfriars Abbey, lies in Ystad. The town also has an additional large medieval church, the Church of the Virgin Mary (Mariakyrkan). Both are highly influenced by Gothic Hansa architecture (which can also be seen in churches around the Baltic Sea, for instance in Helsingborg, Malmö, and Rostock) and are among the best examples in Sweden of Brick Gothic. In addition, there are areas of surviving medieval town architecture, like the Latin school (built c. 1500) and several townhouses. The city is also included in the European Route of Brick Gothic. From the steeple of the Church of the Virgin Mary the Tower Watchman (tornväktaren or lurblåsaren) sounds his horn every 15 minutes from 21:15 to 01:00 to let the people of Ystad know that the town is safe from fire and enemies. The Tower Watchman also says a special line when sounding his horn: "The clock strikes .... (for example twelve). All is quiet! From fire and thieves may God preserve the town!" The tradition has existed since the eighteenth century.

Notable residents

Richard Andersson (born 1972), musician and songwriter
Malik Bendjelloul (1977–2014), documentary filmmaker
Axel Fredrik Bjurström (1846–1890) newspaper publisher, businessman
Rolf Holmgren (born 1946), actor and scriptwriter
Ernst-Hugo Järegård (1928–1998), actor
Frans Jeppsson-Wall (born 1998), singer
Börje Langefors (1915–2009), computer scientist
Lykke Li (born 1986), singer-songwriter
Sara Li born Sara Linnea Larsson (born 1988), singer
Gunnar Malmquist (1893–1982), astronomer
Anna Q. Nilsson (1888–1974), Swedish-born American actress
Michael Saxell (born 1956), songwriter, artist and producer
Jahn Teigen (1949–2020), Norwegian singer, musician and comedian
Markus Persson (born 1979), video game programmer and designer, creator of Minecraft

References

External links

The Municipality´s  official site
Ystads Allehanda's site

 
Populated places in Ystad Municipality
Populated places in Skåne County
Municipal seats of Skåne County
Swedish municipal seats
Port cities and towns of the Baltic Sea
Populated places established in the 11th century
Coastal cities and towns in Sweden
13th-century establishments in Skåne County
Cities in Skåne County

fi:Ystadin kunta